Cinna is a small genus of grasses known by the common name woodreeds. There are only four known species but they are quite widespread in the Americas and northern Eurasia.

Woodreeds are perennial grasses with long, soft panicle inflorescences. They are found in moist areas, especially near bodies of water.

 Species
 Cinna arundinacea - sweet woodreed, stout woodreed - eastern Canada, eastern + central United States
 Cinna bolanderi - Bolander's woodreed - central California (Fresno, Tulare, Mariposa Cos)
 Cinna latifolia - drooping woodreed -  northern Eurasia from Norway to Japan + Magadan; Canada incl Arctic territories; northern + western United States
 Cinna poiformis - Mexico, Central America, Venezuela, Colombia, Peru, Ecuador, Bolivia

 formerly included
species now considered better suite to other genera: Agrostis Andropogon Arctagrostis Calamagrostis Dichelachne Echinopogon Limnodea Muhlenbergia Pogonatherum Sporobolus

See also
 List of Poaceae genera

References

Pooideae
Poaceae genera